Manitoba Provincial Road 331 is an east-west provincial road in the south-central section of the Canadian province of Manitoba.

Route description 

The route begins at PR 240 south of Portage la Prairie, and terminates at PTH 13 in Oakville.

PR 331 is mainly a straight east-west road, with one major winding section known as Hoop and Holler Bend. This stretch of road skirts the southern banks of the Assiniboine River at around the midway point of the route. Hoop and Holler Bend was used as a controlled breach in the midst of a major flood in the spring of 2011.

PR 331 is paved for its entire length.

History 

In the early 1990s, the Manitoba government decommissioned a number of provincial secondary roads and returned the maintenance of these roads back to the rural municipalities. A portion of PR 331 was included in this decommissioning.

Prior to this, PR 331 extended past its current eastbound terminus with PTH 13 for another  before terminating at the Trans-Canada Highway near the unincorporated community of Fortier. The highway would make a very sharp turn to the left just before its original eastern terminus to allow a more uniform junction with the two highways, and thus reduce the number of collisions at that intersection.

The decommissioned section of PR 331 is now maintained by the Rural Municipality of Portage la Prairie.

References

 

331